Lieutenant colonel David Stanley William Ogilvy, 11th and 6th Earl of Airlie (20 January 1856 – 11 June 1900) was a Scottish peer.

He was born at Florence, Italy. He was the third child and elder son of David Ogilvy, 10th Earl of Airlie, and The Hon. Henrietta Blanche Stanley.

Marriage and family
On 19 January 1886 he married Lady Mabell Frances Elizabeth Gore, daughter of Arthur Gore, 5th Earl of Arran, and Lady Edith Elizabeth Henrietta Jocelyn at St George's, Hanover Square, London, England.

They had six children:

Lady Kitty Edith Blanche Ogilvy (5 February 1887 – 17 October 1969)
Lady Helen Alice Wyllington Ogilvy (21 November 1890 – December 1973)
Lady Mabell Griselda Esther Sudley Ogilvy (22 January 1892 – 4 November 1918)
David Lyulph Gore Wolseley Ogilvy, 12th Earl of Airlie (18 July 1893 – 28 December 1968)
Hon. Bruce Arthur Ashley Ogilvy (15 March 1895 – 29 September 1976)
Captain Hon. Patrick Julian Harry Stanley Ogilvy (26 June 1896 – 9 October 1917)

Career
David Ogilvy was educated at Eton College and Balliol College, University of Oxford. Between 1874 and 1876 he gained the rank of lieutenant in the services of the 1st Regiment, in the Scots Guards and the 10th Royal Hussars. Between 1878 and 1879 he fought in the Second Anglo-Afghan War. Between 1884 and 1885 he fought in the Sudan and Nile Expedition. Between 1885 and 1900 he held the office of Representative Peer of Scotland.

In 1890 he held the office of Deputy Lieutenant of Forfar. In December 1897 he gained the rank of lieutenant colonel in the service of the 12th Royal Lancers.

In 1899 his regiment was called upon for active service to fight in the Second Boer War. He took part in the Battle of Magersfontein on 10–11 December 1899, in which the defending Boer force defeated the advancing British forces amongst heavy casualties for the latter (mentioned in the despatch from Lord Methuen describing the battle). Taking part in the advance to relieve Kimberley, he was again mentioned in despatches by Lord Roberts (31 March 1900), and for gallantry at Modder River. He was again wounded near Brandfort.

He died aged 44 at the Battle of Diamond Hill, Pretoria, Transvaal, South Africa, killed in action, after leading his regiment in a charge which saved the guns. At his death, the Earldom of Airlie was inherited by his six-year-old son David. The Airlie Monument which stands on Tulloch Hill, was erected to commemorate his death.

References

External links 
Grave of DAVID, EARL of AIRLIE, Lt. Col 12th Rl Lancers, Military Cemetery, Diamond Hill, Cullinan, Gauteng, South Africa

1856 births
1900 deaths
10th Royal Hussars officers
12th Royal Lancers officers
Alumni of Balliol College, Oxford
British Army personnel of the Mahdist War
British Army personnel of the Second Boer War
British military personnel killed in the Second Boer War
British military personnel of the Second Anglo-Afghan War
Deputy Lieutenants of Forfarshire
Earls of Airlie
People educated at Eton College
Scottish representative peers
Scots Guards officers
British expatriates in Italy